This is a list of Pakistani films released in 2013. Waar was the all time grossing pakistani film released on EidulAzha this year, replaced by Jawani Phir Nahi Ani released on EidulAzha 2015.

Top Grossing Films

The top 10 films released in 2013 by worldwide gross are as follows:

Scheduled Releases

January - March

April - June

July - September

October - December

See also
 2013 in film
 2013 in Pakistan

References

External links
 Search Pakistani film - IMDB.com

2013
Lists of 2013 films by country or language
Films